Twinkling, also called scintillation, is a generic term for variations in apparent brightness, colour, or position of a distant luminous object viewed through a medium. If the object lies outside the Earth's atmosphere, as in the case of stars and planets, the phenomenon is termed astronomical scintillation; for objects within the atmosphere, the phenomenon is termed terrestrial scintillation. As one of the three principal factors governing astronomical seeing (the others being light pollution and cloud cover), atmospheric scintillation is defined as variations in illuminance only.

In simple terms, twinkling of stars is caused by the passing of light through different layers of a turbulent atmosphere. Most scintillation effects are caused by anomalous atmospheric refraction caused by small-scale fluctuations in air density usually related to temperature gradients. Scintillation effects are always much more pronounced near the horizon than near the zenith (directly overhead), since light rays near the horizon must penetrate a denser layer of and have longer paths through the atmosphere before reaching the observer. Atmospheric twinkling is measured quantitatively using a scintillometer. The effects of twinkling are reduced by using a larger receiver aperture; this effect is known as aperture averaging.

While light from stars and other astronomical objects is likely to twinkle, twinkling usually does not cause images of planets to flicker appreciably.
Stars twinkle because they are so far from Earth that they appear as point sources of light easily disturbed by Earth's atmospheric turbulence, which acts like lenses and prisms diverting the light's path. Large astronomical objects closer to Earth, like the Moon and other planets, encompass many points in space and can be resolved as objects with observable diameters. With multiple observed points of light traversing the atmosphere, their light's deviations average out and the viewer perceives less variation in light coming from them.

See also

 Interplanetary scintillation
 Observational astronomy
 Twinkle, Twinkle, Little Star

References 

Observational astronomy
Atmospheric optical phenomena
Articles containing video clips